24 Caprices may refer to:
 24 Caprices for Solo Violin (Paganini), by Niccolò Paganini
 24 Caprices for Violin (Rode), by Pierre Rode